Trevor Beresford Romeo OBE (born 26 January 1963), better known as Jazzie B, is a British DJ and music producer. He is the founder of Soul II Soul.

Life and career
Jazzie was born in London UK to parents of Antiguan descent in Hornsey, London, the ninth of ten children, several of whom began running sound systems in the 1960s and 1970s. At age 18, Jazzie was working for cockney pop skiffle legend Tommy Steele, as a tape operator. He had his first gig in 1977 working with friends under the Rastafari name Jah Rico. He changed their working name to Soul II Soul in 1982. Soul II Soul was originally an umbrella name for several of his projects - the sound system, a clothing line and Camden record shop, a record imprint, as well as the group itself.

From 1985 to 1989, Jazzie and Soul II Soul would hold what would be regarded as a legendary night at the Africa Centre in Covent Garden. The Soul II Soul track "Fairplay" was recorded there just before the group started to find wider success. The nights at the Africa Centre would be celebrated in the 2003 compilation "Soul II Soul At The Africa Centre".

In March 1991 he launched the label Funki Dreds and signed the singers Lady Levi and Kofi to the label.

At this time, he would also host a show on then pirate radio station Kiss FM, which would continue through its legal licence and until 1997. From 2009 to 2012, Jazzie B hosted the "Back 2 Life" radio show on BBC London 94.9, which he then bought to Mi-Soul since 2014.

Jazzie has produced and remixed tracks for the likes of Incognito, Maxi Priest, James Brown, Kym Mazelle, Cheryl Lynn, Teena Marie, Johnny Gill, Ziggy Marley, Nas, and Destiny's Child.

He is a founding director of the Featured Artists Coalition.

He has a daughter Jessye (an actress), and a son Mahlon who plays professional football for Cardiff City.

Honours
In 2002, he was listed first in the Business category of the "100 Great Black Britons" list.

He was appointed Officer of the Order of the British Empire (OBE) by Elizabeth II in the 2008 New Year Honours.

In May 2008, he was awarded the first Inspiration award at the Ivor Novello Awards, for being "a pioneer" and "the man who gave black British music a soul of its own".

Discography

Compilation albums
 Jazzie B Presents Soul II Soul at the Africa Centre (Casual, 2003)
 Jazzie B Presents School Days: Life Changing Tracks From The Trojan Archives (Trojan Records|Trojan]], 2008)
 Masterpiece (Ministry of Sound, 2008)

References

External links
 Jazzie B website
 Soul II Soul website

1963 births
Living people
People from Hornsey
English male singers
English DJs
Black British DJs
English record producers
English male rappers
Officers of the Order of the British Empire
Ivor Novello Award winners
Keytarists
Singers from London
English people of Antigua and Barbuda descent
Soul II Soul members